Winstar may refer to:

Winstar Communications
WinStar Farm
WinStar World Casino
Winstar NZ Limited
Margaret Winstar (floruit 1590-1600), Danish courtier